Pascal Deguilhem (born 9 February 1956 in Brouchaud) was a member of the National Assembly of France.  He represented Dordogne's 1st constituency from 2007 to 2017 as a member of the Socialiste, radical, citoyen et divers gauche.

References

1956 births
Living people
People from Dordogne
Socialist Party (France) politicians
Deputies of the 13th National Assembly of the French Fifth Republic
Deputies of the 14th National Assembly of the French Fifth Republic